The OOPic is an Object Oriented Programmable Integrated Circuit. Created by Savage Innovations, this PIC microcontroller comes with an IDE (Integrated Development Environment) that supports programming in syntaxes based on the BASIC, Java and C programming languages.

The last three versions released to market were the OOPic-R, the OOPic-S and the OOPic-C, which is a miniature version of the former. The oldest model is the OOPic I, which uses the A.2 version of the firmware.

Architecture

The OOPic firmware defines numerous built-in "objects," which can provide custom methods and properties. The objects may be wrappers for hardware, such as an external infrared sensor or a built-in LED, or logic helpers, such as dividers or logic gates.

The OOPic also makes use of "virtual circuits," where the programmer can create links between object properties.

Example program
The following is an example piece of code written in the BASIC syntax, which links a built-in clock that cycles every 1 Hz to an LED.

' The LED is defined as a single I/O line
Dim Red As New oDio1

' Here we create a virtual wire. Wires are
' used to link output or flag values to
' input values.
Dim W As New oWire

' All OOPic programs need to define a "main" sub-routine.
' This is what will be run when the OOPic is turned on.
Sub Main()
  ' Here we specify the pin number for the I/O line.
  ' The onboard red LED is on pin 7.
  Red.IOLine = 7

  ' The LED can also be used for a button, so we need
  ' to specify whether we wish to read from or write to
  ' the pin.
  ' (cvOutput is a constant value)
  Red.Direction = cvOutput

  ' Now we can set up the wire link!
  ' For the wire's input, we wish to use the built-in
  ' 1Hz timer.
  W.Input.Link(OOPic.Hz1)

  ' Now we send the output of the wire to the LED.
  ' Note that we actually send it to the "Value"
  ' property of the LED, as this is what determines
  ' whether the LED is lit.
  W.Output.Link(Red.Value)

  ' All that's left to do is to tell the wire to
  ' operate, and the OOPic will do the rest!
  ' (cvTrue is a constant value)
  W.Operate = cvTrue

End Sub

This virtual circuit behaviour gives the programmer considerable control and flexibility, and allows for better reaction to real-time behaviours thanks to "Events". The OOPic actually spends the majority of its time updating the virtual circuits, compared to looping through a user's code, so it's in the programmers best interest to use virtual circuits over traditional programming techniques as often as possible.

Other meanings

OOPIC also refers to Object Oriented Particle In Cell which is an object-oriented implementation, written at Berkeley, of a specific method of plasma physics simulation known as particle in cell.

See also 
 Arduino
 BASIC Stamp
 PICAXE

External links 
—The site made by the company that sells the OOPic. 
The OOPic Yahoo group—This is where most discussion takes place about the OOPic. - Obsolete
The OOPic Google group—This is the new discussion / user support group for the ooPic. As of September 2008
The PTSG group—This is the website of Berkeley's Plasma Theory and Simulation Group, the authors of the OOPIC plasma simulation code.

Microcontrollers
Microchip Technology hardware